Cecil Thomas Pringle is an Irish Anglican priest: he was Archdeacon of Clogher from 1989 to 2014 .

Pringle was born near Clones, County Monaghan in 1943; educated at Trinity College, Dublin and the Church of Ireland Theological College; and ordained in 1967. After a curacy in Belfast he held incumbencies at Cleenish and Rossorry. On his retirement, Bishop John McDowell said ‘Cecil Pringle has an unparalleled knowledge of the Diocese of Clogher and has brought all of his skills, enthusiasm and dedication to bear during his period of service as Archdeacon'.

References

1943 births
Living people
Archdeacons of Clogher
Alumni of Trinity College Dublin
20th-century Irish Anglican priests
21st-century Irish Anglican priests
Alumni of the Church of Ireland Theological Institute
People from Clones, County Monaghan